Bipyridines also known as bipyridyls, dipyridyls, and dipyridines, are a family of chemical compounds with the formula (C5H4N)2, consisting of two pyridyl (C5H4N) rings. Pyridine is an aromatic nitrogen-containing heterocycle. Bipyridines are of significance in pesticides. 

Six isomers of bipyridine exist, but two are prominent: 2,2′-bipyridine is a popular ligand. 4,4'-Bipyridine is a precursor to the commercial herbicide paraquat.  The bipyridines are all colourless solids, which are soluble in organic solvents and slightly soluble in water.

2,2′-Bipyridine

2,2′-Bipyridine (2,2′-bipy) is a chelating ligand that forms complexes with most transition metal ions that are of broad academic interest.  Many of these complexes have distinctive optical properties, and some are of interest for analysis.  Its complexes are used in studies of electron and energy transfer, supramolecular and materials chemistry, and catalysis. 

2,2′-Bipyridine is used in the manufacture of diquat.

4,4′-Bipyridine

4,4′-Bipyridine (4,4′-bipy) is mainly used as a precursor to the N,N′-dimethyl-4,4′-bipyridinium dication commonly known as paraquat.  This species is redox active, and its toxicity arises from its ability to interrupt biological electron transfer processes.  Because of its structure, 4,4′-bipyridine can bridge between metal centres to give coordination polymers.

3,4′-Bipyridine
The 3,4′-bipyridine derivatives inamrinone and milrinone are used occasionally for short term treatment of congestive heart failure. They inhibit phosphodiesterase and thus increasing cAMP, exerting positive inotropy and causing vasodilation. Inamrinone causes thrombocytopenia. Milrinone decreases survival in heart failure.

References

 
Chelating agents
Ligands